Abdul Rahim Mohideen Abdul Cader (30 October 1936 – 3 October 2015) was a Sri Lankan politician and businessman. He was a representative from the Kandy District (Mahanuwara) for the United National Party in the Parliament of Sri Lanka. He was Minister of Cooperatives in the UNP government formed in 2001. In August 2004, he was arrested on corruption accusations. In November 2004, he was granted bail.

References

Sri Lankan businesspeople
1936 births
2015 deaths
Members of the 9th Parliament of Sri Lanka
Members of the 10th Parliament of Sri Lanka
Members of the 11th Parliament of Sri Lanka
Members of the 12th Parliament of Sri Lanka
Members of the 13th Parliament of Sri Lanka
Members of the 14th Parliament of Sri Lanka
Government ministers of Sri Lanka
United National Party politicians
United People's Freedom Alliance politicians
Sri Lankan Muslims